"Mirror in the Bathroom" is a single by British ska band the Beat released as a single in 1980 from their debut album I Just Can't Stop It. It reached number 4 in the UK Singles Chart and consequently was their highest charting release in the UK until 1983. It was released again in 1995 as a 12" single and early in 1996 as a CD single (both containing contemporary club remixes) to promote B.P.M.: The Very Best of the Beat. The reissued single reached number 44 in 1996.

The song was ranked at #3 among the top ten "Tracks of the Year" for 1980 by NME.

Composition
According to composer and singer Dave Wakeling, the song originated when he was working on a building site and he got up for work one winter morning after "a couple of drinks" and found his clothes still wet on the bathroom floor. While shaving, he says,

On his way to work on his motorbike, he thought about the idea of "The door is locked, just you and me"; and reflected on the nature of narcissism:

When he first heard David Steele's "revolutionary" 2/2 bassline, he thought, "Wow, that poem I was writing on the motorbike fits it like a glove."

The title of the song led some to believe, mistakenly, that it was about drawing lines of cocaine on a mirror. Wakeling says that "in America in the early '80s, everybody gave me knowing winks and said, 'Oh, I know what that one's about, then, Dave.' And it wasn't that mirror in the bathroom at all, it was the one on the wall, and not the one on your knee."

Release
Jerry Dammers wanted The Beat to release "Mirror in the Bathroom" as their first single for his company 2 Tone Records, but Chrysalis Records, 2 Tone's parent company, refused to allow them to release it as a single. Instead, they released a ska version of the Smokey Robinson song "The Tears of a Clown". When that record was successful, The Beat formed their own label, Go-Feet Records, which released "Mirror in the Bathroom". It was released in April 1980 and reached No. 4 in the UK Charts.

Reception
"Mirror in the Bathroom" was ranked at No. 3 in the NME "Tracks of the Year" list for 1980, and at No. 24 in Sounds magazine's "Singles of the Year" list for 1980. In 2003, Q magazine ranked the song at No. 517 in their list of the "1001 Best Songs Ever". In 2002, Gary Mulholland included the song in his list This is Uncool: The 500 Best Singles Since Punk Rock. In 2001, Michaelangelo Matos included it in his list of "The Top 100 Singles of the 80s." In 2006, 97x ranked it at No. 186 in their list of "The 500 Best Modern Rock Songs of All Time."

Covers 
A cover of "Mirror in the Bathroom", by Ethan Stoller and SuperKnova, appeared in Season 1, Episode 4 of Showtime series Work in Progress.

Later releases
The single was re-released on 21 April 2012 for Record Store Day 2012 as a limited edition 750 run of 7" copies. Its B-side is "Too Nice to Talk To".

Ranking Roger's album 'Pop Off The Head Top' includes a new remix version of 'Mirror in the Bathroom' produced by Gaudi.

The song is included in the soundtracks of the 1987 film Someone to Watch Over Me, the 1997 movie Grosse Pointe Blank, and the 1999 film SLC Punk!, by a project called Fifi.

1990s reissues
12" single, 74321232061 (1995)
 "Mirror in the Bathroom" (Sure is Pure Remix)
 "Mirror in the Bathroom" (Tic Tac Toe Remix)
 "Mirror in the Bathroom" (Simon and Diamond Remix)
 "Mirror in the Bathroom" (Adelphi Remix)
A promo 12" containing only the first two tracks (VAIN 001) was also released.
CD single, 74321232062 (January 8, 1996)
 "Mirror in the Bathroom" (Mark "Spike" Stent Remix) (3:28)
 "Mirror in the Bathroom" (Tic Tac Toe Remix) (5:41)
 "Mirror in the Bathroom" (Adelphi Remix) (4:45)
 "Mirror in the Bathroom" (Original Version) (3:08)

Charts

References

1980 songs
1980 singles
1995 singles
The Beat (British band) songs
Record Store Day releases
Songs written by David Steele (musician)
Works about narcissism
Songs written by Ranking Roger
Song recordings produced by Bob Sargeant